Charles Patrick McAvoy Jr. (born December 21, 1997) is an American professional ice hockey defenseman for the Boston Bruins of the National Hockey League (NHL). He was selected 14th overall in the 2016 NHL Entry Draft by the Bruins.

Early life 
McAvoy was born on December 21, 1997, in Long Beach, New York. His father, Charles McAvoy Sr., was the fourth-generation owner of Charles A. McAvoy Plumbing & Heating in Long Beach, while his mother Jennifer worked as an elementary school teacher in Bethpage, New York. Although he grew up surrounded by New York Islanders fans, McAvoy and his family were supporters of the New York Rangers of the National Hockey League (NHL), as several members of the Rangers were customers at the family plumbing company.

Playing career
McAvoy played in the 2010 Quebec International Pee-Wee Hockey Tournament with the New York Rangers minor ice hockey team. In August 2013, McAvoy committed to play college hockey at Boston University.

McAvoy played for the USA Hockey National Team Development Program in the United States Hockey League for two seasons. During the 2015–16 NCAA men's ice hockey season, BU coach David Quinn paired McAvoy with star BU defenseman and future fellow NHL player Matt Grzelcyk, already selected as a third round 2012 NHL Entry Draft pick by the Boston Bruins. McAvoy was part of the gold medal-winning team at the 2015 IIHF World U18 Championships. He was also a member of the bronze medal-winning U-20 team at the 2016 World Junior Ice Hockey Championships.

Leading up to the 2016 NHL Entry Draft, McAvoy was highly regarded by scouts and was considered one of the top four defensemen available.

McAvoy was a member of the USA team that won gold in the 2017 World Junior Ice Hockey Championships. He was awarded Player of the Game honors in the gold-medal game.

As of March 29, 2017, McAvoy ended his college hockey career by signing for an amateur try-out with the Providence Bruins, the Boston team's AHL development organization. On April 10, McAvoy signed an entry-level NHL contract.

McAvoy's first game was on April 12, 2017, a 2–1 victory over the Ottawa Senators, in the playoffs. Despite having no prior NHL experience, he logged the second most ice time on the team. At a time when four of their top six defenders were injured, McAvoy notched three assists in six games. Following the Bruins' loss to the Ottawa Senators in the first round of the playoffs, by mid-June 2017 Bruins legend and Hall of Fame defenseman Bobby Orr spoke highly of McAvoy's level of talent and work ethic towards succeeding in NHL-level play.

McAvoy made his NHL regular season debut on October 5, 2017, the Bruins season opener against the Nashville Predators. McAvoy got his first regular season points in the game, a goal and an assist in a 4–3 win.

On December 18, 2017, McAvoy scored a Gordie Howe hat trick, which is an unofficial stat where a player gets a goal, an assist, and a fight in one game, against the Columbus Blue Jackets. The Bruins went on to win the game, 7–2.

Shortly after New Years' 2018, McAvoy was operated on for symptoms of what was diagnosed as supraventricular tachycardia, evidenced by an episode of heart arrhythmia following the Bruins' November 26, 2017 home game against the Edmonton Oilers. He was expected to take two weeks to fully recover from the ablative procedure used to treat the condition. By January 29, McAvoy had resumed practicing at the Warrior Ice Arena, only one week (January 22) after completing the atrial ablation procedure. By February 1, McAvoy had resumed full participation with his teammates in Bruins team practice sessions at the Warrior facility. McAvoy returned to NHL play on February 3, 2018, skating some 18:51 of ice time during a 4-1 Bruins home ice win against the Toronto Maple Leafs.

During the first game of a six-game homestand at the TD Garden, on February 27, 2018 McAvoy scored the winning overtime goal against the Carolina Hurricanes in a 4–3 home ice win, as the youngest Bruins defenseman to ever achieve the feat.
On March 31, 2018, prior to a game against the Florida Panthers, McAvoy was the recipient of the 2017/18 NESN 7th Player Award. Following the Bruins defeat in the second round of the 2018 Stanley Cup playoffs, McAvoy was named to the senior United States roster to compete at the 2018 IIHF World Championship. At the conclusion of the 2017–18 NHL season McAvoy made the NHL All-Rookie team while finishing 5th overall in voting for the Calder Memorial Trophy for rookie of the year.

The following season, after playing in seven games, McAvoy was taken out of the Bruins lineup due to suffering a concussion on October 18 in a game against the Edmonton Oilers. He was officially placed on the Bruins injured reserve on October 30, and was activated off injured reserve on December 6, after missing 20 games. In his second game back, McAvoy left a game between the Bruins and Toronto Maple Leafs early after a late hit from Leafs forward Zach Hyman, but did not suffer any apparent injury. Hyman later received a two-game suspension for the hit. May 7, 2019, McAvoy was suspended one playoff game for an illegal check to the head of Columbus Blue Jackets Right Winger Josh Anderson during game 6 of the second round of the 2019 NHL Playoffs. As a result of the suspension he missed game 1 of the Eastern Conference Final against the Carolina Hurricanes.

On September 15, 2019, McAvoy signed a three-year, $14.7 million contract with the Bruins.

On October 15, 2021, McAvoy signed an eight-year, $76 million contract extension with the Bruins.

Personal life
Born to Charles and Jennifer McAvoy, McAvoy grew up in Long Beach, New York, with older sister Kayla and younger sisters Holly and Heather. He attended Long Beach High School for one year before moving to Pioneer High School in Ann Arbor, Michigan, when he joined the USA Hockey developmental team.

McAvoy grew up a New York Rangers fan and says he was a big fan of defenseman Brian Leetch, who had concluded his own NHL career by playing for the Bruins in 2006. He also has named former Rangers defenseman Ryan McDonagh as a favorite, and says he tries to emulate Los Angeles Kings defenseman Drew Doughty and Nashville Predators defenseman Tyson Barrie.

McAvoy is engaged to Kiley Sullivan, his longtime girlfriend. Sullivan is the daughter of Penguins' head coach Mike Sullivan. The two met at Boston University, and got engaged in July 2022 in Italy.

International play

McAvoy has won a gold medal at every junior level. He won at the 2014 World U-17 Hockey Challenge (January), 2015 IIHF World U18 Championships and 2017 World Junior Ice Hockey Championships. McAvoy led all defenseman in scoring at the 2018 IIHF World Championship, with 9 points despite only playing 6 games because the Boston Bruins were still in the second round of the NHL Stanley Cup playoffs. He won the bronze medal at the tournament.

Career statistics

Regular season and playoffs

International

Awards and honors

References

External links

1997 births
Living people
American men's ice hockey defensemen
Boston Bruins draft picks
Boston Bruins players
Boston University Terriers men's ice hockey players
Ice hockey players from New York (state)
National Hockey League first-round draft picks
People from Long Beach, New York
Providence Bruins players
Long Beach High School (New York) alumni
AHCA Division I men's ice hockey All-Americans